Eriogonum spergulinum is a species of wild buckwheat known by the common name spurry buckwheat.

Varieties
There are three varieties: two are limited and endemic to the Sierra Nevada in California; while the more common of the three, var. reddingianum, the Redding buckwheat, can be found from California to Idaho.

Description
This buckwheat is an annual herb varying in form from prostrate to erect, 40 centimeters long including inflorescence. The plant is mostly naked, with sparse linear leaves around the base of the stem and at points along the stem. The flowering stems are slender and branching, bearing clusters of small white flowers with dark midribs, giving a floating, "baby's-breath" appearance.

External links
Jepson Manual Treatment - Eriogonum spergulinum
Eriogonum spergulinum - Photo gallery

spergulinum
Flora of California
Flora of Idaho
Flora of Oregon
Flora of Nevada
Endemic flora of the United States
Flora of the Cascade Range
Flora of the Great Basin
Flora of the Sierra Nevada (United States)
Natural history of the Transverse Ranges
Flora without expected TNC conservation status